Miss America 1944, the 18th Miss America pageant, was held at the Warner Theater in Atlantic City, New Jersey on September 9, 1944. Venus Ramey, Miss District of Columbia won the title and also received swimsuit and talent preliminary awards.

One of the five finalists, Betty Jane Rase, who would become known as B. J. Baker, was a backup singer for many top recording artists, and also was one of the wives of actor Mickey Rooney.

Results

Awards

Preliminary awards

Other awards

Contestants

References

Secondary sources

External links
 Miss America official website

1944
1944 in New Jersey
September 1944 events
Events in Atlantic City, New Jersey